The Belmont–Sheffield Trust and Savings Bank Building is a historic building built in 1928 and located at 1001 W. Belmont Avenue, Chicago, Illinois, United States. It is listed as one of the National Register of Historic Places since 1984.

History 
The six-story building was designed by architect John A. Nyden. It was constructed in a U-shape around a two-story central atrium, which allowed light to reach the bank lobby—the glass atrium has since been roofed over. 

When the building was first completed, it held the Belmont–Sheffield Trust and Savings Bank on the first floor and part of the second; offices on the rest of the second floor and on the third floor; and the Montfield Hotel (address 3146 N. Sheffield) on floors four through six. However, the bank closed on June 24, 1932, due to financial difficulty following the Great Depression.  The bank portion of the building then remained vacant until World War II, when local rationing board 40-46 took over the space. The building also housed the Lake View Citizens' Council in the 1950s.

It struggled with vacancy until 1984, when a developer received a federal loan to convert the Montfield Hotel into 54 apartments, maintaining stores on the ground floor.  The building was sold again to another developer and the upper floors converted into loft condos in 2005, which are now listed at the address 3150 N. Sheffield. In 2008, the Commission on Chicago Landmarks designated the building a landmark along with 15 other neighborhood bank buildings.

References

 "Bank at Belmont and Sheffield Gets New Home". (Nov. 18, 1928). Chicago Tribune, p. B1.
 "4 City Project Given Rehabilitation Funds". (March 30, 1984). Chicago Tribune, p. A7.
 "Rationing Board Takes over Old Bank Building". (Jan. 24, 1943). Chicago Tribune, p. N1.
 "Plan $850,000 Building for Belmont Ave." (June 10, 1927). Chicago Tribune, p. 30.
 "Central Mfg. District Bank to Pay 22 Pct." (Dec. 21, 1934). Chicago Tribune, pg. 37.

External links

 National Register of Historic Places Nomination Form
 Illinois Historic Preservation Agency Property Report (more photos)

Commercial buildings completed in 1928
Bank buildings on the National Register of Historic Places in Illinois
Commercial buildings on the National Register of Historic Places in Chicago
Art Deco architecture in Illinois
1928 establishments in Illinois